Matthew Hillsman Taylor, Jr. (January 8, 1917 – November 2, 1994), known professionally as Peter Taylor, was an American novelist, short story writer, and playwright. Born and raised in Tennessee and St. Louis, Missouri, he wrote frequently about the urban South in his stories and novels.

Biography
Taylor was born in Trenton, Tennessee, to Matthew Hillsman "Red" Taylor, a prominent attorney who played football at Vanderbilt University in 1904 and '05, and Katherine Baird (Taylor) Taylor. His father was named after Matthew Hillsman, a long-time local Baptist pastor.  His father's father, Colonel Robert Zachary Taylor, had fought for the Confederate Army as a private under Nathan Bedford Forrest. When working in 1908 as an attorney for the West Tennessee Land Company, which had bought interests in property at Reelfoot Lake, he was kidnapped with attorney Quentin Rankin in October and shot by night riders, who were harassing and intimidating people associated with the company. Initially reported as killed, Taylor escaped by swimming across the lake. Rankin was shot and hanged the same night.

His mother's father was Robert Love Taylor, a politician and writer from eastern Tennessee who served one term as a US Congressman, and three two-year terms as governor of Tennessee in the 19th century, and as United States Senator from Tennessee from 1907 until his death in 1912.

During his early childhood, Taylor lived with his family in Nashville. The family moved to St. Louis in 1926 when Taylor's father became president of the General American Life Insurance Company. In St. Louis, Taylor attended the Rossman School and St. Louis Country Day School. In 1932, the family moved to Memphis, where his father established a law practice. Taylor graduated from Central High School in Memphis in 1935. He wrote his first published piece while there, an interview with actress Katharine Cornell.

After a gap year in which he traveled to England, Taylor enrolled at Southwestern at Memphis (now Rhodes College) in 1936, studying under the critic Allen Tate.  Tate encouraged Taylor to transfer to Vanderbilt University, which he later left to continue studying with the great American critic and poet John Crowe Ransom at Kenyon College in Gambier, Ohio. Poet Robert Lowell from Boston was also enrolled there and they became lifelong friends.  Taylor also befriended Robert Penn Warren, Randall Jarrell, Katherine Anne Porter, Jean Stafford, James Thackara, Robie Macauley and other significant literary figures of the time.

Considered to be one of the finest American short story writers, Taylor made his fictional milieu the urban South, with references to its history.  His characters, usually middle or upper-class people, often are living in a time of change in the 20th century, and struggle to discover and define their roles in society.

His collection The Old Forest and Other Stories (1985) won the PEN/Faulkner Award. Taylor also wrote three novels, including A Summons to Memphis in 1986, for which he won the 1987 Pulitzer Prize for Fiction and In the Tennessee Country in 1994.  Taylor taught literature and writing at Kenyon and at the University of Virginia.

He was married for fifty-one years to the poet Eleanor Ross Taylor and died in Charlottesville, Virginia, in 1994. His papers are held at the Albert and Shirley Small Special Collections Library at the University of Virginia.

He was a Charter member of the Fellowship of Southern Writers.

Works

Short story collections
A Long Fourth and Other Stories, introduction by Robert Penn Warren, Harcourt, 1948.
The Widows of Thornton (includes a play), Harcourt, 1954, reprinted, Louisiana State University Press, 1994.
Happy Families Are All Alike: A Collection of Stories, Astor Honor, 1959.
Miss Leonora When Last Seen and Fifteen Other Stories, Astor Honor, 1963.
The Collected Stories of Peter Taylor, Farrar, Straus, 1969.
In the Miro District and Other Stories, Knopf, 1977.
The Old Forest and Other Stories, Dial, 1985.
The Oracle at Stoneleigh Court, Knopf, 1993.

Novels
A Woman of Means, Harcourt, 1950; reprinted, Frederic C. Beil, 1983, Picador, 1996.
A Summons to Memphis, Knopf, 1986.
In the Tennessee Country, Knopf, 1994.

Plays
Tennessee Day in St. Louis, Random House, 1959.
A Stand in the Mountains, published in Kenyon Review, 1965; reprinted, Frederic C. Beil, 1985.
Presences: Seven Dramatic Pieces (contains "Two Images," "A Father and a Son," "Missing Person," "The Whistler," "Arson," "A Voice through the Door," and "The Sweethearts"), Houghton, 1973.

Other
(Editor with Robert Lowell and Robert Penn Warren) Randall Jarrell, 1914-1965, Farrar, Straus, 1967.

Peter Taylor Reading and Commenting on His Fiction (audio tape), Archive of Recorded Poetry and Literature, 1987.

Awards and honors
 1986 – PEN/Faulkner Award for Fiction for The Old Forest and Other Stories
 1987 – Pulitzer Prize for Fiction for A Summons to Memphis
 1993 – PEN/Malamud Award for "excellence in the art of the short story"

References

Further reading
Peter Taylor: A Writer's Life by Hubert H. McAlexander, Louisiana State University Press, 2001
"Peter Taylor: The Undergraduate Years at Kenyon," by Hubert H. McAlexander, The Kenyon Review, New Series, Vol. 21, No. 3/4 (Summer - Autumn, 1999)
 Inventory of the Peter Taylor papers at  Vanderbilt University, https://web.archive.org/web/20100620103320/http://www.library.vanderbilt.edu/speccol/pdf/taylor_peter.pdf
 Inventory of the Peter Hillsman Taylor Papers at the Albert and Shirley Small Special Collections Library, University of Virginia

Stuart Wright Collection: Peter Hillsman Taylor Papers (#1169-013), East Carolina Manuscript Collection, J. Y. Joyner Library, East Carolina University

20th-century American novelists
American male novelists
Writers from Nashville, Tennessee
1917 births
1994 deaths
Rhodes College alumni
Kenyon College alumni
Kenyon College faculty
Pulitzer Prize for Fiction winners
PEN/Faulkner Award for Fiction winners
University of Virginia faculty
20th-century American dramatists and playwrights
American male dramatists and playwrights
American male short story writers
20th-century American short story writers
Writers of American Southern literature
O. Henry Award winners
PEN/Malamud Award winners
20th-century American male writers
Novelists from Ohio
People from Trenton, Tennessee
Members of the American Academy of Arts and Letters